Vigna angularis, also known as the adzuki bean , azuki bean, aduki bean, red bean, or red mung bean, is an annual vine widely cultivated throughout East Asia for its small (approximately  long) bean. The cultivars most familiar in East Asia have a uniform red color, but there are also white, black, gray, and variously mottled varieties.

Scientists presume Vigna angularis var. nipponensis is the progenitor.

Origin and diversity

Speciation and domestication 
The wild ancestor of cultivated adzuki bean is probably Vigna angularis var. nipponensis, which is distributed across Japan, Korea, China, Nepal and Bhutan. Speciation between Vigna angularis var. nipponensis and Vigna angularis var. angularis occurred around  years ago. Archaeologists estimate it was domesticated around 3000 BC. However, adzuki beans (as well as soybeans) dating from 3000 BC to 2000 BC are indicated to still be largely within the wild size range. Enlarged seeds occurred during the later Bronze Age or Iron Age, periods with plough use. Domestication of adzuki beans resulted in a trade-off between yield and seed size. Cultivated adzuki beans have fewer but longer pods, fewer but larger seeds, a shorter stature, and also a smaller overall seed yield than wild forms. The exact place of domestication is not known; multiple domestication origins in East Asia have been suggested.

Breeding

In Japan, the adzuki bean was one of the first crops subjected to scientific plant breeding. Important breeding traits are yield, pureness of the bean colour, and the maturing time. Separate cultivars with smaller seeds and higher biomass are bred for fodder production and as green manure. Locally adapted cultivars are available in China, Japan, Korea, and Taiwan. More than 300 cultivars/landraces/breeding lines are registered in Japan. Moreover, China (Institute of Crop Germplasm Resources (CAAS), Beijing, more than 3700 accessions) and Japan (Tokachi Agricultural Experiment Station, Hokkaido, about 2500 accessions) accommodate large germplasm collections of adzuki bean.

Weed forms
Weed forms of adzuki bean frequently occur in Japan. The wide spread of weed forms is due to adaptation to human-disturbed habitats, escapes of old cultivars, and natural establishment from derivatives of hybrids between cultivars and wild forms. In contrast to wild forms, the weed forms of adzuki bean are used as a substitute for the cultivated form and consumed as sweet beans, especially if cultivated adzuki beans are attacked by pests. However, in cultivated gardens the weed form is recognized as contamination and lowers the seed quality of adzuki cultivars.

Names

The name adzuki is a transliteration of the native Japanese アヅキ, as it was spelled according to historical kana orthography. The name is also transliterated as azuki, reflecting the modern spelling アズキ, or less commonly as aduki, according to an alternate system of romanization. All are meant to represent the same Modern Japanese pronunciation, azuki.

Japanese also has a Chinese loanword, which means "small bean", its counterpart  being the soybean. In English the beans are often described as "red beans" in the context of Chinese cuisine, especially in reference to red bean paste, but the term is not otherwise used as other beans are also red in color. In normal contexts, "red cowpeas" have been used to refer to this bean. ("beans") without qualifiers usually means soybeans. In Vietnamese it is called  (literally: red bean). In some parts of India, the beans are referred to as "red chori". In Punjabi it is called  and is a common ingredient of chaat. In Iraq its name is  meaning "red cowpeas".

Cultivation

Area and yield
The adzuki bean is mainly cultivated in China ( ha), Japan ( ha), South Korea ( ha), and Taiwan ( ha) (data published 2006). The bean is also grown commercially in the US, South America, and India, as well as New Zealand, Congo, and Angola.  In Japan, the adzuki bean is the second most important legume after the soy bean; its 1998 annual yield of this crop was around 100,000 tons. With a consumption of about 140,000 t/year (data published 2006), Japan is also the most important importer of adzuki beans. The imports are received from China, Korea, Colombia, Taiwan, US, Thailand, and Canada.

The bean yields per area spread over a broad range due to differing cultivation intensity. Amounts of 4 to 8 dt/ha are reported, but in Japan and China yields between 20 and 30 dt/ha are reached.

Ecological requirements
Optimal temperature range for adzuki bean growth is between 15 °C and 30 °C. The crop is not frost-hardy and needs soil temperatures above 6–10 °C (30–34 °C optimal) for germination. Hot temperatures stimulate vegetative growth and are therefore less favorable for pea production. The adzuki bean is usually not irrigated. Annual rainfall ranges from 500 to 1750 mm in areas where the bean is grown. The plant can withstand drought but severe reduction in yield is expected. The cultivation of the adzuki bean is possible on preferably well drained soils with pH 5–7.5. Fertilizer application differs widely depending on expected yield but is generally similar to soybean. Due to nodulation with rhizobia, nitrogen fixation of up to 100 kg/ha is possible.

Production
The sowing of the peas is in 2–3 cm depth in rows 30–90 cm apart and 10–45 cm within the row. Rarely seeds are sown by broadcast. The amount of seeds ranges between 8–70 kg/ha. Growth of the crop is slow, therefore weed control is crucial mainly between germination and flowering. Cultivation systems differ largely among different countries. In China adzuki bean is often grown in intercrops with maize, sorghum and millet while in Japan the bean is grown in crop rotations. Harvest of the peas should not be done as long as moisture content of the seed is higher than 16%.

Pests and diseases
Fungal and bacterial diseases of the adzuki bean are powdery mildew, brown stem rot, and bacterial blight. Furthermore, pests such as the adzuki pod worm, Japanese butterbur borer, and cutworm attack the crop. The bean weevil is an important storage pest.

Botany

The description of the adzuki bean can vary between authors because there are both wild and cultivated forms of the plant. 
The adzuki bean is an annual, rarely biennial bushy erect or twining herb usually between 30 and 90 centimeters high. There exist climbing or prostrate forms of the plant. The stem is normally green and sparsely pilose.

Roots
The adzuki bean has a taproot type of root system that can reach a depth of 40–50 cm from the point of seed germination.

Leaves
The leaves of the adzuki bean are trifoliate, pinnate and arranged alternately along the stem on a long petiole. Leaflets are ovate and about 5–10 cm long and 5–8 cm wide.

Flowers
Adzuki flowers are papilionaceous and bright yellow. The inflorescence is an axillary false raceme consisting of six to ten (two to twenty) flowers.

Fruits
Adzuki pods are smooth, cylindrical and thin-walled. The colour of the pods is green turning white to grey as they mature. The size is between 5–13 cm × 0.5 cm with 2 to 14 seeds per pod. Pod shatter during seed ripening and harvesting might be a difficulty under certain conditions.

Seeds
The seeds are smooth and subcylindric with a length of 5.0-9.1 mm, width of 4.0-6.3 mm, thickness of 4.1-6.0 mm. The thousand kernel weight is between 50 and 200 g. There are many different seed colours from maroon to blue-black mottled with straw.

Physiology
The emergence of the seedlings is hypogeal and takes 7–20 days. Compared to other pulses the growth of the plant is slow. Normally the adzuki plant reaches maturity between 80 and 120 days depending on the cultivar and the environmental conditions. Flowering lasts 30–40 days. Commonly the plant self-pollinates but cross-pollination also exists.

Culinary uses

In East Asian cuisine, the adzuki bean is commonly sweetened before eating. In particular, it is often boiled with sugar, producing red bean paste, a very common ingredient in all of these cuisines. It also is common to add flavoring to the bean paste, such as chestnut. Red bean paste is used in many Chinese dishes, such as tangyuan, zongzi, mooncakes, baozi, and red bean ice. It also serves as a filling in Japanese sweets such as anpan, dorayaki, imagawayaki, manjū, monaka, anmitsu, taiyaki, and daifuku. A more liquid version, using adzuki beans boiled with sugar and a pinch of salt, produces a sweet dish called hong dou tang. Some East Asian cultures enjoy red bean paste as a filling or topping for various kinds of waffles, pastries, baked buns, or biscuits.

Adzuki beans are commonly eaten sprouted or boiled in a hot, tea-like drink.

Traditionally in Japan, rice with adzuki beans (赤飯; sekihan) is cooked for auspicious occasions. Adzuki beans are used in amanattō and ice cream with the whole bean or as paste.

Nutritional information
Cooked adzuki beans are 66% water, 25% carbohydrates, including 7% dietary fiber, 8% protein, and contain negligible fat (table). In a 100-gram reference amount, cooked beans provide  of food energy, a moderate to high content (10% or more of the Daily Value, DV) of the B vitamin folate (30% DV), and several dietary minerals (11% to 27% DV, table).

Gallery

See also

Black-eyed pea
Sea Island red pea
Kidney beans
Red bean paste
Sekihan

References

External links

 Illustrated Plant Genetic Resources Database
 Alternative Field Crop Manual

 

Articles containing video clips
Edible legumes
Japanese cuisine
Korean cuisine
Vigna
Yunnan cuisine